Green onion or scallion refers to various edible members of the genus Allium that lack a fully developed bulb.

Green onion may also refer to:
Green Onions (album), a 1962 album by Booker T. & the M.G.s
"Green Onions", a hit 1962 soul instrumental by Booker T. & the M.G.s on the album listed above